Scott Robert Mersereau (born April 8, 1965) is a former defensive lineman for the New York Jets of the National Football League (NFL). He attended college at Southern Connecticut State University. He played professionally for the New York Jets for seven seasons, beginning in 1987.

Mersereau is most known for a collision with teammate, the late Dennis Byrd, in which Byrd was paralyzed from a neck injury during an NFL game against the Kansas City Chiefs on November 29, 1992. During the play, Byrd rushed in an attempt to sack Chiefs quarterback Dave Krieg, but Krieg stepped up to avoid the tackle, and Byrd collided with Mersereau. Byrd ducked his head at the last moment before he collided with Mersereau's chest. The head-first collision resulted in a broken C-5 vertebra that left Byrd paralyzed. Byrd later recovered, but didn't play football again. Byrd died in October, 2016, in a traffic-related accident.

Mersereau initially thought he only had a sprained ankle, and played through the remainder of the 1992 season and all of the 1993 season. However, he required regular painkiller injections through the 1993 season due to severe back pain, and was released by the Jets after that season. When he tried to sign on with the Green Bay Packers, he failed the team physical, with the team doctor telling him he had three cracked vertebrae in his lower back. Mersereau believes he suffered his back injury in the collision with Byrd.

Mersereau suffered from excruciating back pain for several years, and had two unsuccessful operations on his back. A 1996 spinal fusion was finally successful, though not until after an extended recovery that left him bedridden for six months. He has since married and currently works as a financial advisor. Additionally, Mersereau has four children and coaches football at Boca Raton Community High School in his spare time.

On February 18, 2017, Mersereau was charged in Boca Raton, Florida with child cruelty after allegedly grabbing, pushing and twice punching a 15-year-old boy. Mersereau, who was reported as being intoxicated at the time, was upset the exterior of his South Florida home had been egged, and believed the teen was responsible. Mersereau was reportedly released on $3,000 bail.

References

1965 births
American football defensive tackles
High school football coaches in Florida
Living people
New York Jets players
People from Riverhead (town), New York
Players of American football from New York (state)
Southern Connecticut State Owls football players
Sportspeople from Boca Raton, Florida